Parmotrema amboimense is a species of lichen in the family Parmeliaceae that is found in Africa. It was first described by Carroll William Dodge in 1959 as a species of Parmelia. Mason Hale transferred it to the genus Parmotrema in 1974.

See also
List of Parmotrema species

References

amboimense
Lichen species
Lichens described in 1959
Lichens of Africa
Taxa named by Carroll William Dodge